Recital is a 2013 jazz album by Nigel Kennedy and the Orchestra of Life for Sony Classical.

Track listing
Sweet & Slow (Fats Waller)
"Take Five" (Dave Brubeck)
I'm Crazy About My Baby (Fats Waller)
Por do sol (Ze Gomez)
Viper's Drag (Fats Waller)
New Dawn (Nigel Kennedy)
Out of the Ocean (Irish Traditional / Nigel Kennedy)
How Can You Face Me Now (Fats Waller)
Allegro - inspired by Bach (Bach / Kennedy)
Vivace - inspired by Bach (Bach / Kennedy)
Helena's Honeysuckle (Yaron Stavi)
Dusk (Nigel Kennedy)

References

2013 albums
Nigel Kennedy albums
Sony Classical Records albums